hit104.9 The Border (ACMA callsign: 2AAY) is an Australian radio station owned by Southern Cross Media.  The station is based in Albury New South Wales. Some programs based in Albury are simulcast to other Hit Network regional radio stations across the country.

Breakfast is hosted by Tim and Jess, Mornings is hosted by Tyson & Afternoons is hosted by Maddy. Other programs include Carrie and Tommy, Hughesy, Ed and Erin, Hot Nights, Jimmy and Nath, MC, Those Two Girls & Saturday Night Party Playlist''

On 14 December 2016 Southern Cross Austereo rebranded all of their regional Hit Network affiliated stations to one centralised "Hit" brand.

References

External links
Official Website

Radio stations in New South Wales
Radio stations established in 1993
Contemporary hit radio stations in Australia
1993 establishments in Australia